Menna Patricia Humphreys Gallie (18 March 1919 – 17 June 1990) was a Welsh novelist and translator. She is best known for her novels in the English language, and as the translator of Caradog Prichard's Un Nos Ola Leuad, under the title Full Moon.

Early life and education
Menna Patricia Humphreys was born in Ystradgynlais, and attended Swansea University, where she met the philosopher W. B. Gallie. They were married in 1940, and had a son and a daughter. Both were politically active, with a commitment to democratic socialism.

Career
Her first novel Strike for a Kingdom is "both an engrossing detective novel and a social panorama of a small Welsh village during the 1926 General Strike". It was reprinted by Honno, the Welsh Women's Press, in 2003, with an introduction by Angela John. It was dramatised by BBC Radio 4 in 2012. by Diana Griffiths.

Man's Desiring (1960) was described by a reviewer as a novel with "warm and winning ways" a gentle comedy of contrasts about a Welsh man and an English woman at a Midlands university.

The Small Mine (1962) tells the tale of a young collier's death in an industrial accident in the same fictional village created in Strike for a Kingdom. It was dramatised for BBC Radio 4 in 2004 by Diana Griffiths.

Travels with a Duchess (1968) is the journey of a menopausal wife from Cardiff who loses her luggage en route to Yugoslavia and abandons her usual ways in favour of adventure and 'debauchery'.

Novels
Strike for a Kingdom (1959) (reprinted 2003, 2011); shortlisted for Gold Dagger Award
Man's Desiring (1960)
The Small Mine (1962) (reprinted 2003, 2010)
Travels with a Duchess (1968) (reprinted 1996, 2011)
You're Welcome to Ulster! (1970) (reprinted 2010)
In These Promiscuous Parts (1974)

References

1919 births
1990 deaths
20th-century Welsh novelists
20th-century Welsh women writers
People from Powys
Alumni of Swansea University
Anglo-Welsh novelists
Welsh crime novelists
Women mystery writers
Proletarian literature
Welsh socialists
European democratic socialists